Werner Herzog Eats His Shoe is a short documentary film directed by Les Blank in 1980 that depicts director Werner Herzog living up to his promise that he would eat his shoe if Errol Morris ever completed the film Gates of Heaven.  The film includes clips from both Gates of Heaven and Herzog's 1970 feature Even Dwarfs Started Small. Comic song "Old Whisky Shoes", played by the Walt Solek Band, is the signature tune over the opening and closing credits.

Filmed in April 1979, the movie features Herzog cooking his shoes (the ones he claims to have been wearing when he made the bet) at the Berkeley, California, restaurant Chez Panisse, with the help of chef Alice Waters. (The shoes were boiled with garlic, herbs, and stock for 5 hours.) He is later shown eating one of the shoes before an audience at the premiere of Gates of Heaven at the nearby UC Theater. He did not eat the sole of the shoe, however, explaining that one does not eat the bones of the chicken.

Morris is not shown in the film, and Herzog, Morris, and others have told different stories of the nature of the bet, disagreeing as to whether it was serious, flippant, or an after-the-fact publicity stunt.

Blank went on to direct Burden of Dreams (1982), a feature-length documentary about Herzog and the making of Fitzcarraldo. Werner Herzog Eats His Shoe is included as an extra on The Criterion Collection edition of the Burden of Dreams DVD. It is also included as an extra in the  Criterion Collection edition of the Gates of Heaven Blu-ray disc.

When Chez Panisse celebrated its 40th anniversary, a replica of the shoe was created, boiled, and eaten as part of the public anniversary celebration.

The Academy Film Archive preserved Werner Herzog Eats His Shoe in 1999.

References

External links
 
 Trailer at YouTube

1980 films
American short documentary films
1980s short documentary films
Films directed by Les Blank
Documentary films about film directors and producers
Uses of shoes
Werner Herzog
1980s English-language films
1980s American films